Family S.O.S. with Jo Frost is an American reality television series that premiered May 28, 2013, on TLC.

Synopsis
Much like her original series, Supernanny, Jo visits homes of families who need assistance with instilling peace within the home. Unlike her original series, Jo helps families of any age, size or structure — not just children. It gives an insight to solving some of the issues created in part by the 21st century such as cyberbullying.

Episodes

References

2010s American reality television series
2013 American television series debuts
2013 American television series endings
English-language television shows
TLC (TV network) original programming
Television series about families